Mount Adam is a mountain on Vancouver Island, British Columbia, Canada, located  east of Woss and  south of Mount Schoen.

See also
List of mountains of Canada

References

Adam, Mount
One-thousanders of British Columbia
Rupert Land District